Vishvarupa Sena, also known as Biswaroop Sen in vernacular literature, was the fifth ruler from the Sena dynasty of the Bengal region on the Indian subcontinent.

See also
List of rulers of Bengal
History of Bengal
History of India

References

Rulers of Bengal
13th-century monarchs in Asia
Year of death unknown
Year of birth unknown
Sena dynasty